Albert James Turner (7 April 1901 – 24 April 1985) was an English professional footballer who played as a wing half. He made one appearance in the Football League Third Division North for Nelson in the 1921–22 season.

References

English footballers
Association football wing halves
Nelson F.C. players
English Football League players
Sportspeople from Blackpool
1901 births
1985 deaths